Beyond the Permafrost is the second full length album by American metal band Skeletonwitch. The album blends thrash metal and influence from the NWOBHM movement with death/black metal vocals. The song "Soul Thrashing Black Sorcery" was featured in the video game, Brütal Legend. The songs, while aggressive, also have melodic parts.

Track listing

Personnel 
 Chance Garnette – vocals
 Nate Garnette – guitar
 Scott Hedrick – guitar
 Eric Harris – bass guitar
 Derrick Nau – drums

References 

2007 albums
Skeletonwitch albums
Albums with cover art by John Dyer Baizley